Kosmoceratidae is an extinct ammonite family from the Callovian (Middle Jurassic) to Early Cretaceous.

Kosmoceratidae are probably the most polymorphic groups of Jurassic ammonites.  These ammonoids have a more or less tabulate venter, with lateral or ventrolateral tubercles. The aptychus is double valved with a concentrically ribbed surface.

References

 Philippe Courville, Catherine Crônier - Diversity or Disparity in the Jurassic (Upper Callovian) genus Kosmoceras (ammonitina): A Morphometric Approach

External links
 Crioceratites
 Ammonites

Jurassic ammonites
Callovian first appearances
Middle Jurassic extinctions
Ammonitida families
Stephanoceratoidea